Roy Jones Guyer (October 25, 1885 – April 3, 1956) was an American college football player and college football, basketball, baseball, and soccer coach. He served as the head football coach at Lebanon Valley College from 1908 to 1910 and again from 1913 to 1917 and at the University of Connecticut in 1919, compiling a career college football coaching record of 27–39–2.  Guyer died on April 3, 1956, at his home in Storrs, Connecticut.

Head coaching record

Football

Baseball
The following table depicts Guyer's record as head baseball coach at Connecticut.

References

1885 births
1956 deaths
American men's basketball players
Basketball coaches from Pennsylvania
Basketball players from Pennsylvania
Lebanon Valley Flying Dutchmen football coaches
Lebanon Valley Flying Dutchmen football players
Lebanon Valley Flying Dutchmen men's basketball coaches
Lebanon Valley Flying Dutchmen men's basketball players
People from Franklin County, Pennsylvania
Shippensburg Red Raiders football players
Springfield Pride football players
UConn Huskies athletic directors
UConn Huskies baseball coaches
UConn Huskies football coaches
UConn Huskies men's basketball coaches
UConn Huskies men's soccer coaches
American soccer coaches